Stadionul Municipal is a multi-use stadium in Dorohoi, Botoșani County, Romania. It is currently used mostly for football matches, it holds 2,000 people and is the home ground of the local team Inter Dorohoi and Dante Botoșani.

References

External links
Soccerway profile. soccerway.com

Football venues in Romania
Buildings and structures in Botoșani County
Dorohoi